The 1929 Australian Grand Prix was a motor race held at the Phillip Island circuit in Victoria, Australia on 18 March 1929. The race, which was organised by the Victorian Light Car Club, had 27 entries and 22 starters. It is recognised by the Motorsport Australia as the second Australian Grand Prix.

The race was won by Arthur Terdich driving a Bugatti Type 37A.

Classes
Cars competed in four classes:
 Class A: Under 900cc
 Class B:  901cc - 1100cc
 Class C: 1101cc - 1500cc
 Class D: 1501cc - 2000cc

Race format
Class B cars started the race first followed by the Class A entries thirty seconds later. 			
Class C cars started next, the first group four minutes after the Class A cars and the remainder thirty seconds after that.			
The Class D cars were the last to start, thirty seconds after the Class C cars.	

The winner of the Grand Prix was to be the entry, irrespective of class, which made the fastest time for the race.

Classification 

 Wallace-Crabbe failed to complete the race distance within the prescribed time limit.

Notes 
 Average speed of winning car: 61.7 miles an hour

References

External links
 Motor-Racing, Australian Grand Prix, Course of 200 Miles, Contest at Cowes on Monday, The Argus, Saturday 16 March 1929, Page 20, as archived at trove.nla.gov.au
 Grid sheet, as archived at trove.nla.gov.au
 Australian Grand Prix - Terdich wins in Bugatti, The Referee, Wednesday 20 March 1929, Page 17, as archived at trove.nla.gov.au
 200 Miles Motor road Race at Cowes, The Argus, Tuesday 19 March 1929, Page 5, as archived at trove.nla.gov.au

Grand Prix
Australian Grand Prix
Motorsport at Phillip Island
Australian Grand Prix